Platinum pentafluoride is the inorganic compound with the empirical formula PtF5. This red volatile solid has rarely been studied but is of interest as one of the few binary fluorides of platinum, i.e., a compound containing only Pt and F. It is hydrolyzed in water.

The compound was first prepared by Neil Bartlett by fluorination of platinum dichloride above 350 °C (below that temperature, only PtF4 forms).

Its structure consists of a tetramer, very similar to that of ruthenium pentafluoride.  Within the tetramers, each Pt adopts octahedral molecular geometry, with two bridging fluoride ligands.

References

Fluorides,5
Fluorides
Platinum group halides